In organic chemistry, polyenes are poly-unsaturated, organic compounds that contain at least three alternating double and single carbon–carbon bonds. These carbon–carbon double bonds interact in a process known as conjugation, resulting in some unusual optical properties.  Related to polyenes are dienes, where there are only two alternating double and single bonds.

The following polyenes are used as antibiotics for humans: amphotericin B, nystatin, candicidin, pimaricin, methyl partricin, and trichomycin.

Optical properties
Some polyenes are brightly colored, an otherwise rare property for a hydrocarbon.  Normally alkenes absorb in the ultraviolet region of a spectrum, but the absorption energy state of polyenes with numerous conjugated double bonds can be lowered such that they enter the visible region of the spectrum, resulting in compounds which are coloured (because they contain a chromophore).  Thus many natural dyes contain linear polyenes.

Chemical and electrical properties 
Polyenes tend to be more reactive than simpler alkenes. For example, polyene-containing triglycerides are reactive towards atmospheric oxygen. Polyacetylene, which partially oxidized or reduced, exhibits high electrical conductivity. Most conductive polymers are polyenes, and many have conjugated structures. Poly(aza)acetylenes are readily prepared from pyridine precursors without the necessity of a controlled atmosphere, simply by ultraviolet irradiation of a mixture of pyridine and poly(4-vinyl) pyridine. Recent research at the Weizmann Institute and Aix-Marseille University showed a clear transition between ionic and electronic conductivity with increasing UV dose over 30 hours.

Occurrence
A few fatty acids are polyenes.  Another class of important polyenes are polyene antimycotics,

References

Polyenes
Conjugated hydrocarbons